Pyramidella ovata is a species of sea snail, a marine gastropod mollusk in the family Pyramidellidae.

References

Gastropods described in 1873
Pyramidellidae